Events from the year 1392 in Ireland.

Incumbent
Lord: Richard II

Events
 Thomas of Woodstock, 1st Duke of Gloucester, is created Lieutenant of Ireland but forbidden to travel there.

Births
James Butler, 4th Earl of Ormonde (d. 1452)

Deaths

References